Georgiana Bruce Kirby Preparatory School, referred to as Kirby School, is a co-educational, non-sectarian independent school located in Santa Cruz, California. The school educates students in grades 6–12.

History and general information
Established in 1994, Kirby School is named after Georgiana Bruce Kirby, an early suffragist, educator, and public speaker who settled in California in the mid-1800s.

In August 2006, the school moved to the Tarantella building, formerly a high-technology complex in the Harvey West area of Santa Cruz.

Academic achievements and recognition
In 2006, the College Board Advanced Placement Report to the Nation recognized Kirby students as the "Best in the World" in Art History performance by a school with 300 or fewer students. In the spring of 2009,
Kirby students took 99 AP exams. 94% scored 3 or higher (college credit),
and 47% achieved the maximum score of 5.

From 1999 through 2009, Kirby graduated 250 students, of which thirty-six (15%) earned National Merit recognition.  25% of the graduating class of 2014 earned National Merit recognition.

Affiliations
Kirby is a member of and is accredited by the California Association of Independent Schools, the National Association of Independent Schools, and the Western Association of Schools and Colleges.

References

External links
 Official site

High schools in Santa Cruz County, California
Educational institutions established in 1994
Private high schools in California
Private middle schools in California
Preparatory schools in California
Santa Cruz, California
1994 establishments in California